The 2015 Open de Rennes was a professional tennis tournament played on hard courts. It was the tenth edition of the tournament which was part of the 2015 ATP Challenger Tour. It took place in Rennes, France between 12 and 18 October 2015.

Singles main-draw entrants

Seeds

 1 Rankings are as of October 5, 2015

Other entrants
The following players received wildcards into 
  Enzo Couacaud
  Maxime Janvier
  Alexandre Sidorenko
  Maxime Teixeira

The following players entered the singles main draw as alternates:
  Jonathan Eysseric
  Artem Smirnov

The following players received entry from the qualifying draw:
  Romain Barbosa
  Jeremy Jahn
  Romain Jouan
  James Marsalek

The following player entered as a lucky loser:
  Sebastien Boltz

Champions

Singles

 Malek Jaziri def.  Igor Sijsling, 5–7, 7–5, 6–4.

Doubles

 Andrea Arnaboldi /  Antonio Šančić def.  Wesley Koolhof /  Matwé Middelkoop, 6–4, 2–6, [14–12]

External links
Official Website

Open de Rennes
Open de Rennes
2015 in French tennis